Mayra Lissette Conde (born January 28, 1969 in Guatemala City, Guatemala) is a professional Personal Trainer and mixed martial artist, who has also competed in bodybuilding, kickboxing and brazilian jiu-jitsu.

Biography
Conde hails from Guatemala City, where she grew up on her grandparents' farm. She has spoken fondly of her time there in interviews, as well as citing her grandfather as "my source of strength". However, at the age of nine when her younger brother was born, Conde moved with her parents to Toronto, Ontario, Canada, hoping for a better education.

Her early years as an immigrant were tough; "I was constantly picked on because I couldn't speak English and was very small". Conde succeeded academically and became bilingual, speaking both her native Spanish and adopted English. While still at school, Conde developed an interest in sports drinks and nutrition through her father, which led to her becoming a bodybuilder at the age of 16. Her muscular physique proved useful when she moved into construction work after high school. Earning a living as a welder, she would later become a foreman. Meanwhile, she continued to attend fitness seminars and read health-related books.

In 1993, she met Zee Vjesalicu a wrestler, hockey player and mixed martial artist who introduced Conde and her friend Olga Bakalapolous to Brazilian Jui Jitusu. For a short period of time Zee trained Conde. Conde's first grappling competition, she won. 
In the summer of 1996, Conde moved to Los Angeles for the love of personal fitness training, and in search for something bigger and more challenging. She trained in Brazilian jiu-jitsu at the Beverly Hills Jiu Jitsu Club with such fighters including Mark Kerr and Bas Rutten. Learning from them and another trainer, Marcus Vinicius, she would later fight in the United States, Brazil and Greece and Japan, being part of the all-female "Hook N Shoot" Revolution promotion.

She was asked her to represent Team Canada at the 1st World Wide Pankration Championships on 11 November 2000, in Lamia, Greece. Despite a last minute notice and traveling at her own expense, she earned two gold medals. She was later invited to train with Coach Scott Miller and the Women's Wrestling Team at Pacific University in late 2002 and March 2003. Conde is a Purple Belt Brazilian Jiu-Jitsu Instructor, having studied under 4th Degree Black Belt Master Marcus Vinicius and Bas Rutten at The Beverly Hills Jiu Jitsu Club.

Conde is now living and working in Frankfurt am Main, Germany as a professional personal trainer. According to German authorities (in Frankfurt), she is the only foreign self-employed personal trainer authorized to live and work in Germany, without the need of an employer at first, due to the fact that she is a high level certified martial artist, instructor and personal trainer.

Career
Mayra Lissette Conde started her Personal Training career in the 1990s, where she worked at The Workout in Toronto, Ontario, Canada.

In 1996 Conde moved to Los Angeles to pursue her bodybuilding dream and to enhance her Fitness Training career.

On 2003 Conde moved to Europe, mainly to get away from the competitive world of Full Contact Sports. On 2005 Conde started working full-time as a Personal Fitness Trainer in Frankfurt am Main, Germany.

Mayra Lissette Conde has been known as Canadian bodybuilder, who at 26 entered the world of Full Contact Fighting.

These days Conde is known as an experienced Personal Fitness Trainer, Martial Arts Instructor, who shares her passions with her clients using most effective training techniques. Conde is known as a Body Sculpting Specialist with over 27 years experience, "Get In The Best Shape Of Your Life"  faster than you thought..." is her driven motivation.

 1st Place at the 3rd American International Championships, Grappling (148-160 lbs) Light Weight Division, Carson, CA, 9 December 2001
 1st Place at the 3rd American International Championships, Brazilian Jiu Jitsu Women's Open Division, Carson, CA, 8 December 2001
 1st Place in the US Open Brazilian Jiu Jitsu CHAMPIONSHIPS, October 2001
 2001 Bronze Medalist in the World Wide Brazilian Jiu Jitsu Championships in Rio de Janeiro, Brazil (July 26–29 )
 Double GOLD Medalist in 1st World Wide Pankration Championships on 11 November 2000, Lamia, Greece
 1st place winner in the Heavy weight & Open Division in the U.S. Open Brazilian Jiu Jitsu Championships in Santa Cruz, 5 November 2000
 Winner in NHB Bout at the Mark "The Cobra" Hall's Cobra Challenge Federation, in Anza CA on 3 June 2000
 1st Place winner in the California State Brazilian Jiu Jitsu Championships, 26 March 2000
 U.S. Open Brazilian Jiu Jitsu Heavy Weight and Overall Winner, Santa Cruz (White Belt), 5 November 2000
 Won Cobra Challenge NHB fight, 6 March 2000
 Women's Kick-Boxing Division Winner, September 1999
 Women's Heavy Weight Grappler's Challenge Champion, August 1999
 Winner by technical K.O. in Kick-Boxing Bout at the Bas Rutten Invitational in Littleton CO, 26 June 1999
 Winner in NHB/Vale Tudo Bout at the 1st Bas Rutten Invitational, 6 February 1999
 1st Place Women's Heavyweight Winner at the Grapplers Challenge in Toronto, Ontario, Canada on 8 August 1998
 Nite Magic Flexmania Ladies Overall (Bodybuilding), July 1996

See also
List of female mixed martial artists

References

Mixed martial arts record

|-
|Loss
| align=center| 2-1-1
|Yuuki Kubota
|Submission (Armbar)
|Smackgirl - Third Season 1
|03/3/2003
|1
|2:20
|
|
|-
| Draw
| align=center| 2-0-1
|Angela Reestad
|
|HOOKnSHOOT - Revolution
|04/13/2002
|2
|5:00
|
|
|-
|Win
| align=center| 2-0
|Val Leota
|Submission (Choke)
|CFF - The Cobra Challenge 2000
|06/3/2000
|1
|1:00
|
|
|-
|Win
| align=center| 1-0
|Kelsey Beard
|TKO
|BRI 1 - Bas Rutten Invitational 1
|02/6/1999
|1
|N/A
|
|
|}

External links
 Official site
 Mayra Conde Awakening Fighters

1969 births
Canadian female bodybuilders
Canadian female mixed martial artists
Mixed martial artists utilizing Brazilian jiu-jitsu
Canadian practitioners of Brazilian jiu-jitsu
Female Brazilian jiu-jitsu practitioners
Living people
Exercise instructors
Guatemalan female bodybuilders
Guatemalan female mixed martial artists
Guatemalan practitioners of Brazilian jiu-jitsu